Pandit Zil-e-Ram Chochra is an Indian politician and member of the Indian National Congress. Chochra was a member of the Haryana Legislative Assembly from the Assandh constituency in Karnal district.

References 

People from Hisar district
Indian National Congress politicians
Haryana Janhit Congress politicians
Members of the Haryana Legislative Assembly
Living people
21st-century Indian politicians
Year of birth missing (living people)